Gérard Worms (1 August 1936 – 31 August 2020) was a French banker and businessman. He served as the Vice Chairman of Rothschild Europe and Senior Advisor of Rothschild & Cie Banque.

Biography

Early life
Gérard Worms was born on 1 August 1936 in Paris. He graduated from the École Polytechnique and Mines ParisTech.

Career
He started his career as a technical adviser in the French civil service. He served as an Advisor to Olivier Guichard (1920–2004), Minister of Industry from 1967 to 1968, and to Jacques Chaban-Delmas (1915–2000), Prime Minister from 1969 to 1972. Since 1972, he worked at the Hachette Group, the Rhône-Poulenc group, the Société Générale de Belgique and Telecom Italia. He served as Deputy Chairman of Supervisory Board and Vice President of M6. From 1990 to 1995, he served as the Chief Executive Officer of the Compagnie de Suez. From 1995 to 1999, he served as the Chairman of the Compagnie de Suez and Indosuez Private Banking.

He was a Member of the Supervisory Board of Publicis from 1998 to 2013. He served on the Boards of Directors of Saatchi & Saatchi, Mercapital, Éditions Atlas, Paris Orléans, Financière Saint Merri and Cofide. He served as the Chairman of the International Chamber of Commerce (ICC) from 2011 to 2013. He also served on the Board of Advisors of Degrémont. Additionally, he was a member of Le Siècle, a French think tank. He also sat on the Board of Directors of the Fondation Ensemble and on the Ethics Committee of Fondapol.

He taught at the HEC Paris, the University of Paris and his alma mater, the École Polytechnique. He also co-wrote a book.

He served as the Chairman of Rothschild & Cie Banque (Paris) from 1995 to 1999. He served as Vice Chairman of the European subsidiary of Banque privée Edmond de Rothschild. He also served as Chief Executive Officer of N M Rothschild & Sons. He served as Vice Chairman of Rothschild Europe and Senior Advisor of Rothschild & Cie Banque. Additionally, he served on the Audit Committee of Publicis.

Death
Worms died on 31 August 2020.

Bibliography
Gérard Worms, Jean Mothes, Méthodes modernes de l'économie appliquée (Dunod, 1974, 259 pages).

References

2020 deaths
1936 births
Businesspeople from Paris
Mines Paris - PSL alumni
École Polytechnique alumni
French bankers
Academic staff of the University of Paris